Alberto Castilla Buenaventura (Bogotá 9 April 1878 - Ibagué 10 June 1937), was a Colombian composer. He was born in Bogotá. He was also an engineer, journalist, poet, writer, mathematician and musician. He founded the Conservatory of Tolima in 1906.

He composed the famous Bunde of Tolima instrumental music to which Nicanor Velásquez added verses to create what is now is the Hymn of the Tolima Department.

References

 Miller, Terry, and Sean Williams. Southeast Asia (Garland Encyclopedia of World Music, Volume 4). 4. Routledge; Har/Com edition (April 1998), 1998. Print.

1878 births
1937 deaths
Colombian musicians